Rompin River is a river in the Malaysian state of Pahang. It flows through the southeastern part of Pahang before emptying into the South China Sea.

See also
 List of rivers of Malaysia

References

Rivers of Pahang
Rivers of Malaysia